Hong Chi-jung (1667–1732) was a scholar-official and Prime Minister of the Joseon Dynasty Korea in the 18th century from 1729 to 1732.

He was also diplomat and ambassador, representing Joseon interests in the 9th Edo period diplomatic mission to the Tokugawa shogunate in Japan.

1719 mission to Japan
In 1719, King Sukjong dispatched a diplomatic mission to the shogunal court of Tokugawa Yoshimune.  This diplomatic mission functioned to the advantage of both the Japanese and the Koreans as a channel for developing a political foundation for trade.

This delegation was explicitly identified by the Joseon court as a "Communication Envoy" (tongsinsa).  The mission was understood to signify that relations were "normalized."

The Joseon embassy arrived in Kyoto on the 10th month of the 4th year of Kyōhō, according to the Japanese calendar in use at that time. Hong Chi-jung was the chief envoy.

Recognition in the West
Pak Tong-chi's historical significance was confirmed when his mission and his name was specifically mentioned in a widely distributed history published by the Oriental Translation Fund in 1834.

In the West, early published accounts of the Joseon kingdom are not extensive, but they are found in Sangoku Tsūran Zusetsu (published in Paris in 1832), and in Nihon ōdai ichiran (published in Paris in 1834).  Joseon foreign relations and diplomacy are explicitly referenced in the 1834 work.

See also
 Yeonguijeong
 Joseon diplomacy
 Joseon missions to Japan
 Joseon tongsinsa

Notes

References

 Daehwan, Noh.  "The Eclectic Development of Neo-Confucianism and Statecraft from the 18th to the 19th Century," Korea Journal (Winter 2003).
 Lewis, James Bryant. (2003). Frontier contact between chosŏn Korea and Tokugawa Japan. London: Routledge. 
 Titsingh, Isaac, ed. (1834). [Siyun-sai Rin-siyo/Hayashi Gahō, 1652], Nipon o daï itsi ran; ou,  Annales des empereurs du Japon.  Paris: Oriental Translation Fund of Great Britain and Ireland.  OCLC  84067437
 Walker, Brett L.  "Foreign Affairs and Frontiers in Early Modern Japan: A Historiographical Essay," Early Modern Japan. Fall, 2002, pp. 44–62, 124-128.
 Walraven, Boudewijn and Remco E. Breuker. (2007). Korea in the middle: Korean studies and area studies; Essays in Honour of Boudewijn Walraven. Leiden: CNWS Publications. ;

External links
 Joseon Tongsinsa Cultural Exchange Association ; 
 조선통신사연구 (Journal of Studies in Joseon Tongsinsa) 

1667 births
1732 deaths
18th-century Korean people
Korean diplomats
Namyang Hong clan